Adel Theodor Khoury (Arabic: عادل خوري) (born March 26, 1930 in Tebnine, Lebanon) is a Catholic theologian and historian of Christianity and Islam.

After theological studies Khoury entered priesthood in 1953. He also pursued philosophy and Oriental studies in Beirut before receiving a doctoral degree in Lyon. From 1970 until his retirement in 1993 Khoury was professor of general religious studies (Allgemeine Religionswissenschaft) in the Catholic-Theological Department of Westfälische Wilhelms-Universität Münster, Germany, where he twice served as head of the department.

Khoury is notable for his publications on Islam and his efforts toward interfaith understanding. In 1985 he was named advisor of the Pontifical Council for Interreligious Dialogue. In 1997 he was awarded the Austrian distinction "Grand Decoration of Honour" for his efforts to promote Christian-Muslim dialogue. His 12-volume commentary of the Quran (1990-2001) also won recognition in the Muslim world. His thematic concordance and German translation of the Quran was selected in Iran as "book of the year" in 2009.

Khoury is also known for his comprehensive surveys of Byzantine anti-Islamic polemics. His edition of dialogues of the Byzantine emperor Manuel II Palaiologos with an "educated Persian" gained wider attention when it was cited in a 2006 speech of Pope Benedict XVI which sparked worldwide controversy.

A Festschrift in honor of Khoury's 60th birthday was published in 1990.

In 2004, Khoury is said to have witnessed a miracle in Soufanieh, where Myrna Nazzour had stigmata.

Works 
 Manuel Paléologue. Entretiens avec un Musulman, Introduction, texte critique, traduction et notes par Theodore Khoury, Editions du cerf, Paris 1966
 Les théologiens Byzantins et l’islam: Texts et auteurs (VIIIe-XIIIe siècles). Louvain, Belgium, and Paris:Nauwelaerts, 1969.
 Polémique Byzantine contre l’islam; VIIIe-XIIIe siècles. Leiden: Brill, 1972.
 Einführung in die Grundlagen des Islams. Graz, Wien, Köln: Styria 1978 
 Apologétique Byzantine contre l’islam; VIIIe-XIIIe siècles. Altenberge, Germany: Verlag für christlich-islamisches Schriftum, 1982.
 Der Islam: sein Glaube, seine Lebensordnung, sein Anspruch. Freiburg im Breisgau; Basel; Wien: Herder 1988 u.ö. 
 (Ed.): Lexikon des Islam: Geschichte, Ideen, Gestalten. 3 Bde., 1. Aufl. 1991 ; überarbeitete Neuaufl. 1999 ; CD-ROM 2004 
 (Hg.): Das Ethos der Weltreligionen. Freiburg im Breisgau; Basel; Wien: Herder 1993 
 Christen unterm Halbmond: religiöse Minderheiten unter der Herrschaft des Islam. Freiburg im Breisgau; Basel; Wien: Herder 1994 
 (Ed.): Kleine Bibliothek der Religionen. 10 Bde., Freiburg im Breisgau; Basel; Wien: Herder 1995-2001
 zus. m. Peter Heine und Janbernd Oebbecke: Handbuch Recht und Kultur des Islams in der deutschen Gesellschaft: Probleme im Alltag - Hintergründe - Antworten. Gütersloh: Gütersloher Verl.-Haus 2000 
 Der Islam und die westliche Welt: religiöse und politische Grundfragen. Darmstadt: WBG; Primus 2001 
 Mit Muslimen in Frieden leben: Friedenspotentiale des Islam. Würzburg: Echter 2002 
 (Ed.): Krieg und Gewalt in den Weltreligionen: Fakten und Hintergründe. Freiburg im Breisgau; Basel; Wien: Herder 2003 
 (Übersetzung und Kommentar): Der Koran: arabisch-deutsch. Gütersloh: Kaiser, Gütersloher Verl.-Haus 2004 
 Der Koran: erschlossen und kommentiert von Adel Theodor Khoury. Düsseldorf: Patmos 2005  (Rezension bei H-Soz-u-Kult)
 (Ed.): Die Weltreligionen und die Ethik. Freiburg im Breisgau; Basel; Wien: Herder 2005 
 Sufanieh: eine Botschaft für die Christen in der Welt. Altenberge: Oros 2005

Literature 
 Ludwig Hagemann; Ernst Pulsfort (ED.): "Ihr alle aber seid Brüder": Festschrift für A. Th. Khoury zum 60. Geburtstag. Würzburg: Echter; Altenberge: Telos 1990

References

1930 births
Living people
20th-century German Catholic theologians
Lebanese emigrants to Germany
Members of the European Academy of Sciences and Arts
Academic staff of the University of Münster
German male non-fiction writers